A millionaire is an individual whose net worth or wealth is equal to or exceeds one million units of currency. Depending on the currency, a certain level of prestige is associated with being a millionaire. In countries that use the short scale number naming system, a billionaire is someone who has at least a thousand times a million dollars, euros or the currency of the given country.

Many national currencies have, or have had at various times, a low unit value, in many cases due to past inflation. It is obviously much easier and less significant to be a millionaire in those currencies, thus a millionaire (in the local currency) in Hong Kong or Taiwan, for example, may be merely averagely wealthy, or perhaps less wealthy than average. A millionaire in Zimbabwe in 2007 could have been extremely poor. Because of this, the term 'millionaire' generally refers to those whose assets total at least one million units of a high-value currency, such as the United States dollar, Euro, or Pound Sterling.

, there were estimated to be just over 15 million millionaires in the world according to the Global Citizens Report by Henley & Partners. The United States had the highest number of millionaires (5,325,000) of any country, whilst New York is the wealthiest city with 345,000 millionaires.

Terminology
The word "millionaire" was apparently coined in French in 1719 to describe speculators in the Mississippi Bubble who earned millions of livres in weeks before the bubble burst. (The standard French spelling is now , though the earliest reference uses a single n.) The word was first used (as millionnaire, double "n") in French in 1719 by Steven Fentiman, and is first recorded in English (millionaire, as a French term) in a letter of Lord Byron of 1816, then in print in Vivian Grey, a novel of 1826 by Benjamin Disraeli. Earlier English writers also mention the French word, including Sir William Mildmay in 1764. The OED's first print citation is Benjamin Disraeli's 1826 novel Vivian Grey, The anglicisation millionary was used in 1786 by Thomas Jefferson while serving as Minister to France; he wrote: "The poorest labourer stood on equal ground with the wealthiest Millionary".

While statistics regarding financial assets and net worth are presented by household, the term is also often used to describe only the individual who has amassed the assets as millionaire. That is, even though the term statistically refers only to households, common usage is often in reference only to an individual.

Net worth vs. financial assets

There are multiple approaches to determining a person's status as a millionaire. One of the two most commonly used measurements is net worth, which counts the total value of all property owned by a household minus the household's debts. According to this definition, a household owning an $800,000 home, $50,000 of furnishings, two cars worth $60,000, a $60,000 retirement savings account, $45,000 in mutual funds, and a $325,000 vacation home with a $250,000 mortgage, $40,000 in car loans, and $25,000 in credit card debt would be worth about $1,025,000; and every individual in this household would thus be a millionaire. However, according to the net financial assets measurement used for some specific applications (such as evaluating an investor's expected tolerance for risk for stockbroker ethics), equity in one's principal residence is excluded, as are lifestyle assets, such as the car and furniture. Therefore, the above example household would only have net financial assets of $115,000. Another term used is "net investable assets" or working capital. These practitioners may use the term "millionaire" to mean somebody who is free to invest a million units of currency through them as broker. For similar reasons, those who market goods, services and investments to HNWIs are careful to specify a net worth "not counting principal residence". At the end of 2011, there were around 5.1 million HNWIs in the United States, while at the same time there were 11 million millionaires in a total of 3.5 million millionaire households, including those 5.1 million HNWIs.

In the real estate bubble up to 2007, average house prices in some U.S. regions exceeded $1 million, but many homeowners owed large amounts to banks holding mortgages on their homes. For this reason, there are many people in million-dollar homes whose net worth is far short of a million—in some cases, the net worth is actually negative.

Influence
While millionaires constitute only a small percentage of the population, they hold substantial control over economic resources, with the most powerful and prominent individuals usually ranking among them. The total amount of money held by millionaires can equal the amount of money held by a far higher number of poor people. The Gini coefficient, and other measures in economics, estimated for each country, are useful for determining how many of the poorest people have the equivalent total wealth of the few richest in the country. Forbes and Fortune magazines maintain lists of people based on their net worth and are generally considered authorities on the subject. Forbes listed 1,645 dollar billionaires in 2014, with an aggregate net worth of $6.4 trillion, an increase from $5.4 trillion the previous year. (see US-dollar billionaires in the world). According to a report by Hurun, a market research firm based in China, the global billionaire population stood at 3,381 in 2022.

Sixteen percent of millionaires inherited their fortunes. Forty-seven percent of millionaires are business owners. Twenty-three percent of the world's millionaires got that way through paid work, consisting mostly of skilled professionals or managers. Millionaires are, on average, 61 years old with $3.05 million in assets.

Historical worth
Depending on how it is calculated, a million US dollars in 1900 is equivalent to $ (in ).

 $24.8 million using the consumer price index,
 $61.4 million using the gold price

Thus one would need to have almost thirty million dollars today to have the purchasing power of a US millionaire in 1900, or more than 100 million dollars to have the same impact on the US economy.

Multimillionaire

Dated ways of describing someone worth n millions are "n-fold millionaire" and "millionaire n times over". Still commonly used is multimillionaire, which refers to individuals with net assets of 2 million or more of a currency. There are approximately 584,000 US$ multimillionaires who have net assets of $10M+ worldwide in 2017. Roughly 1.5% of US$ millionaires are "ultra-high-net-worth individuals" (ultra-HNWIs), defined as those with a net worth or wealth of $30 million or more. There are approximately 226,000 ultra-HNWIs in the world in 2017, according to Wealth-X.
The rising prevalence of people possessing ever increasing quantities of wealth has given rise to additional terms to further differentiate millionaires. Individuals with net assets of 100 million or more of a currency are commonly termed centimillionaires, or more rarely hectomillionaires.

HNWI population
High-net-worth individuals (those with financial assets, not including the residence, greater than a million US dollars).

Global cities with the most super-wealthy millionaires per capita (higher than $30 million) 

According to wealth research group Wealth-X that released its latest UHNW Cities report, showing the residential footprint of the world's top ultra-high net worth (UHNW) individual cities.

Excluding Monaco – which has very high UHNWI density – Geneva has the highest density of super-wealthy people per capita in the world. The city is known as the most compact metropolitan area, and also enjoys a concentration of affluence. Singapore has the second-highest concentration, followed by San Jose, the center of Silicon Valley, and the largest city in Northern California.
While New York City leads in terms of overall UHNW footprint, London has a similar number of UHNW "second homers" despite a considerably smaller population. Paris features as the second-highest European city, after London, Wealth-X said.
Among suburbs and smaller towns, Beverly Hills has the highest overall number of UHNW residents, and Aspen has the highest concentration on a per capita basis, the report showed.
Ultra-high net worth individuals are defined by Wealth-X as those whose total net worth is higher than $30 million (R400 million).

Number of UHNWIs per country
The following is a list of the countries with the most Ultra high-net-worth individuals (UHNWI) as of November 2019 as per the 2020 Knight Frank's Wealth Report.

Countries by number and percentage of millionaires 

* indicates "Economy of COUNTRY or TERRITORY" links.

Number of millionaires by city 
, New York is the wealthiest city in the world with 345,000 HNWIs according to the Global Citizens Report by Henley & Partners.

Disparity in United States

There is a wide disparity in the estimates of the number of millionaires residing in the United States. 
A quarterly report prepared by the Economist Intelligence Unit on behalf of Barclays Wealth in 2007 estimated that there were 16.6 million millionaires in the US. At the end of 2011, there were around 5.1 million HNWIs in the US, while at the same time, there were 11 million millionaires in a total of 3.5 million millionaire households, including those 5.1 million HNWIs.

According to TNS Financial Services, as reported by CNN Money, 2 million households in the US alone had a net worth of at least $1 million excluding primary residences in 2005. According to TNS, in mid-2006 the number of millionaire US households was 9.3 million, with an increase of half a million since 2005. The study found that half of all millionaire households in the US were headed by retirees. In 2004 the United States saw a "33 percent increase over the 6.2 million households that met that criteria [sic] in 2003", fueled largely by the country's real estate boom.

A report by Capgemini for Merrill Lynch on the other hand stated that in 2007 there were approximately 3,028,000 households in the United States who held at least US$1 million in financial assets, excluding collectibles, consumables, consumer durables and primary residences.

According to TNS Financial Services, Los Angeles County, California, had the highest number of millionaires, totalling over 262,800 households in mid-2006.

See also

Aggregate demand
Billionaire
Business oligarch
Distribution of wealth
High-net-worth individual
Upper middle class
Upper class
Six figure income
Wealth concentration
Who Wants to Be a Millionaire? (game show)
The Millionaire Next Door (book)
Moscow Millionaire Fair
Pierre Lorillard II (first American to be designated a "millionaire")
List of African millionaires
Lists of billionaires
Sunday Times Rich List

References

Distribution of wealth